William Stanley McCabe (June 16, 1908 – June 2, 1958) was a Canadian ice hockey Left Winger. McCabe played 78 NHL games over four seasons for the Detroit Cougars, Detroit Falcons and Montreal Maroons between 1929 and 1934. The rest of his career, which lasted from 1926 to 1939, was spent in various minor leagues.

Career statistics

Regular season and playoffs

External links 
 

1908 births
1958 deaths
Canadian ice hockey left wingers
Detroit Cougars players
Detroit Falcons players
Detroit Olympics (CPHL) players
Detroit Olympics (IHL) players
Ice hockey people from Ottawa
Montreal Maroons players
Philadelphia Arrows players
Pittsburgh Shamrocks players
Quebec Castors players
Windsor Bulldogs (1929–1936) players